Khudhir Zalata (26 September 1938 – 2013) was an Iraqi sprinter. He competed in the 100 metres at the 1960 Summer Olympics and the 1964 Summer Olympics and men's 4 × 100 metres relay at the 1960 Summer Olympics.

References

External links
 

1938 births
2013 deaths
Athletes (track and field) at the 1960 Summer Olympics
Athletes (track and field) at the 1964 Summer Olympics
Iraqi male sprinters
Olympic athletes of Iraq
Sportspeople from Baghdad